Bob Casey (April 11, 1925 – March 27, 2005) was the only public address announcer in Minnesota Twins history until 2005. He started announcing Twins games when the franchise moved to Minnesota from Washington, D.C., in 1961.

Casey worked 44 seasons and more than 3,000 games for the Twins. He was inducted into the Twins' Hall of Fame in 2003.

Early career
Prior to working for the Twins, Casey served as the announcer of the Minneapolis Millers, a  Triple-A team in the old American Association, for 10 years. He also worked for the Minneapolis Lakers and the Minnesota Vikings during his career.

Trademarks
Casey's voice was a trademark of the Minnesota ballpark experience. His style and signature player introductions made him a favorite of fans, players, umpires, the media and team staff. Casey, who missed only a handful of Twins games during his tenure with the team, was well known for his nasally voice and distinctive delivery. He would introduce star Kirby Puckett as "Kirbee (prolonged "e") puck-it!", remind fans there was "No smoking" (with a prolonged "o") at the Metrodome, than he'd add "if you must smoke, go back to (whatever city the opposing team was from)", and not to "throw anything or anybody onto the field".

Verbal gaffes
Casey was also known for his occasional butchering of player names and calls on the field. Many viewed him as the master of mispronunciations. Dustan Mohr? Dustin Hoffman. Otis Nixon? Amos Otis. Nomar Garciaparra? Garcia Parra. Omar Vizquel? Ozzie Virgil. A great Casey moment was at a 1959 game between the Chicago Cardinals and Giants. Casey announced that

"The Giants have been penalized 15 yards for an illegitimate man on the field."
In the early 1970s, during a stadium bomb-scare, he announced that fans should "leave the stadium quickly and calmly, as we have gotten a call that there is going to be an explosion in ten minutes."

Death
On March 27, 2005, Casey died in Minneapolis at age of 79, fifteen days before what would have been his 80th birthday. He had been battling liver cancer and pneumonia. Before he died, baseball great Alex Rodriguez took time to contact him. "He's an icon in our game," Rodriguez said at the time. "His voice will live on forever." Casey said Kirby Puckett and Alex Rodriguez were his favorite players, and had even asked Alex to help him take a ceremonial first pitch that June.

Friends, family, and Twins legends Kent Hrbek, Tony Oliva, Dan Gladden, and Jack Morris served as pallbearers for the 44-year Twins announcer. They held those memories close Wednesday, March 30 as they said goodbye to Casey at his funeral at St. Olaf Catholic Church in Minneapolis. The April 8 home opener vs. the White Sox was an all-game tribute to Casey. There was an on field tribute before the game and members of the Casey family shared PA duties during the game.

References

Major League Baseball broadcasters
Minnesota Twins personnel
Minneapolis Lakers personnel
Minnesota Vikings personnel
Deaths from liver cancer
Sports in Minneapolis–Saint Paul
National Basketball Association public address announcers
National Football League public address announcers
Major League Baseball public address announcers
Deaths from cancer in Minnesota
1925 births
2005 deaths